, son of Masahira, was a court noble (kugyo) of the late Muromachi period. He was regent of Kampaku from 1514 to 1518. Tadafuyu, his son, succeeded him as head of the Takatsukasa family.

References
 https://web.archive.org/web/20070927231943/http://nekhet.ddo.jp/people/japan/fstakatukasa.html#tadafuyutt

1480 births
1552 deaths
Fujiwara clan
Takatsukasa family